Chris Daniels can refer to:

 Christopher Daniels (born 1970), American wrestler
 Chris Daniels (basketball) (born 1984), American basketball player
 Chris Daniels (musician) (born 1952), American musician
 Christian Danielsson (born 1966), Swedish photographer